Fresh Start was the first powdered detergent to come in a plastic bottle. It was also one of the first detergents to be highly concentrated, before all detergents went concentrated.

Fresh Start was a product of the Colgate-Palmolive company and was introduced in the late '70s. In 2005, Colgate-Palmolive sold the North American rights for Fresh Start to Phoenix Brands. The target audience of Fresh Start was mainly active women. Advertisements from that time also depict active women having fun without worrying about laundry.

References

External links 
 Fresh Start’s Marketing and Packaging Gave a Fresh Start to Powder Laundry Detergent (posted Sept. 30, 2010; viewed Oct. 11, 2015)

Laundry detergents
Colgate-Palmolive brands